The Noor Vijeh Company (NVCo) is a private company based in Tehran involved in financing, execution, and operation of major water desalination schemes via reverse osmosis (RO).

History 
The company was established in 2001 and is currently one of Iran's largest private investors in reverse osmosis.

As of June 2020, the registered capital of the company according to the Official Gazette stands at nearly 209.3 billion Rials.

The newest plants to start operation are located in the city of Kangan and Bushehr, for which the opening ceremonies in 2016 received widespread media attention.

Business model 
The preference in NVCo is given to BOO (Build-Own-Operate) and BOT (Build-Operate-Transfer) contracts.

Noor Vijeh's plants are located in Asaluyeh, Bandar Abbas, Bushehr, Kangan, Hendijan, and Chabahar (2 phases).

References 

Water desalination
Water companies of Iran